After playing American football for the University of California as a quarterback, Wayne Crow played professionally for four seasons  as a running back and punter for the Oakland Raiders and Buffalo Bills of the American Football League. In October 1961, he kicked a 77-yard punt to set a Raider record that wasn't broken until 50 years later, when Shane Lechler kicked an 80-yard punt in November 2011—two months after having tied Crow's record.

See also
 Other American Football League players

External links
 Wayne Crow in the 1962 Buffalo Bills' team photo

References

1938 births
Living people
People from Coolidge, Arizona
Sportspeople from the Phoenix metropolitan area
Players of American football from Arizona
American football running backs
California Golden Bears football players
Oakland Raiders players
Buffalo Bills players
American Football League players